Marty Papazian is an American television and film actor. He played CTU Interrogator Rick Burke in the television series 24. Papazian made his directorial debut with the 2012 film Least Among Saints, in which he stars opposite Laura San Giacomo and Charles S. Dutton.

Papazian voiced the main character in 2006 game Black.

Filmography

Film

Television

References

External links

American male actors
American people of Armenian descent
Living people
1976 births